The climate of Zambia in Central and Southern Africa is definitely tropical modified by altitude (elevation). In the Köppen climate classification, most of the country is classified as humid subtropical or tropical wet and dry, with small patches of semi-arid steppe climate in the south-west.

Climate and specifically rainfall amount is the chief determinant of type and distribution of the ecoregions of Zambia.
So technically, Zambia is a very arid country with a humid and subtropical year with small patches of semi arid steppe.

Seasons
There are two main seasons: the rainy season (November to April) corresponding to summer, and the dry season (May to October/November), corresponding to winter. The dry season is subdivided into the cool dry season (May to August), and the hot dry season (September to October/November). The modifying influence of altitude gives the country pleasant subtropical weather rather than tropical conditions for most of the year.

Rainy season
The distinction between rainy and dry seasons is marked with no rain at all falling in June, July and August. Much of the economic, cultural and social life of the country is dominated by the onset and end of the rainy season, and the amount of rain it brings. Failure of the rains causes hunger in most cases. The average temperature in Zambia in the summer season is 30 °C and in the winter (colder season) it can get as low as 5 °C. The rains are brought by the Intertropical Convergence Zone (ITCZ) and are characterised by thunderstorms, occasionally severe, with much lightning and sometimes hail. The ITCZ is located north of Zambia in the dry season. It moves southwards in the second half of the year, and northwards in the first half of the year. In some years, it moves south of Zambia, leading to a "little dry season" in the north of the country for three or four weeks in December.

The highest rainfall is in the north, especially the north-west and the north-east, decreasing towards the south; the driest areas are in the far south west and the Luangwa River and middle Zambezi River valleys, parts of which are considered semi-arid. None of the country is considered arid or to be desert.

Flooding is an annual event on floodplains, to which people and wildlife are adapted. Flash floods after unusually heavy rain cause damage when they occur in places that do not experience annual floods. Erosion and the washing out of roads and bridges are common. Crops are frequently damaged by flooding and hail. Too much rain when the maize crop is flowering or late in the season when it should be drying off prior to harvest, can be very damaging and promotes rotting of stored grain.

Dry season

Plant and animal adaptations
Deciduous trees which lose leaves in the dry season to conserve water predominate over evergreens which have waxy leaf cuticles for the same purpose. The deciduous trees usually produce fresh green or reddish leaves just before the rainy season. Grasses and some other herbaceous plants dry up above ground but regenerate quickly with the onset of rains from roots and tubers, etc.

Except for those living in areas of permanent freshwater, animals are adapted to the long dry season, as seen in migration and breeding patterns.

Bushfires
In the middle to late dry season, bushfires are prevalent, and smoke is noticeable by smell and as a haze. The fires are ignited by villagers hunting, burning crop residue, and preparing chitemene gardens; or by lightning in the early rainy season. Because such fires happen annually, there is no great buildup of dry fuel in the bush, and so the fires are not usually devastating. They may kill animals, and damage crops if the rains end early and fires happen before harvest. The presence of fire-adapted plants and palaeoecological studies indicate that such fires have happened for millennia.

Water sources in the dry season
Most rivers, lakes and swamps, except in the far south and south-west, are permanent. In addition, dambos (grasslands which become marshy in the rainy season) are prevalent in most of the country and water is usually available in them from springs or shallow wells. Dambos also release groundwater to streams and rivers towards the end of the dry season, keeping them flowing permanently. Small earth dams are often constructed in dambos as a source of water and as fishponds.

For the human population, the location of rural settlements is determined by access to water in the dry season (though boreholes are now commonly used to augment supplies). Traditionally, people have also migrated in the drier areas where rivers dambos are not prevalent. In Barotseland, people move with their livestock, grazing them on the Barotse Floodplain in the dry season and moving to higher ground at the margins during the rainy season.

The ability to grow enough food in the rainy season to last the long dry season is also a factor in population distribution. Traditionally some communities have divided the year into farming in the rainy season, and fishing and hunting in the dry season, when herbivores can be found more easily as they visit sources of water, and fires can be set to expose them or drive them into traps.

Temperature
On the plateau (covering about 80% of the country) temperature ranges, depending on location are:

Most of the country is frost-free but in some years ground frost occurs. This is restricted to the highest exposed hills, or more widely in the lower humidity areas of the southernmost parts of the country.

Temperatures are higher at lower elevations, such as the Luapula-Mweru and Mweru Wantipa/Tanganyika valleys in the north, and highest in the lower Luangwa and Zambezi valleys in the south, typically experiencing  in October, with rising humidity making for uncomfortable conditions.

During the rainy season months of November to April or May some days may be humid, but daily maximum temperatures are usually a little lower than in the hot dry season. The rain can be cooling, unlike in the humid tropics.

Examples

Wind
Prevailing winds in the dry season are generally moderate, but occasionally more severe and may bring cool dust-laden air from distant arid regions. Whirlwinds are very common but not usually destructive. Waterspouts can be seen over lakes.

In the rainy season, winds are localised with thunderstorms and may be destructive but usually confined to small areas, such as blowing roofs off buildings. The country does not suffer tornadoes or cyclones of widespread destructive force.

Climate change
Zambia is considered to be vulnerable to climate change. The main impact pathway of climate change in the country is through increasing variability in rainfall amounts during the agricultural season across the various agroecological regions, and shifts in the duration of the rainy season. Zambia is considered vulnerable to the impacts of climate change because the majority of the population rely on agriculture for their livelihoods - and changes in rainfall patterns has a negative impact due to the rainfed nature of production. Researched evidence suggested that temperature was likely to increase by 1.82oC and rainfall reduce by 0.87 percentage points by 2050. This means that the occurrence of extreme climate events such as droughts and floods would become more frequent. Rainfall intensity results in heavy storms thereby causing floods that cause damage to property and crops. The Government of Zambia, like many other countries, had recognised the need to "integrate gender concerns" into all major policies and plans. This is because vulnerability to climate shocks was engendered. Therefore, a Climate Change Gender Action Plan was published by the government in 2018. The plan is concerned with both the development of gender-responsive actions in response to climate change and the capacity to implement such plans.

References

Camerapix: "Spectrum Guide to Zambia." Camerapix International Publishing, Nairobi, 1996.

Environment of Zambia
Zambia